Isaac Dov Berkowitz (16 October 1885 – 29 March 1967), was a Hebrew and Yiddish author and translator.

Biography
Isaac Dov Berkowitz was born in Slutsk, Russian Empire. He immigrated to the United States in 1913, before moving permanently to Mandatory Palestine in 1928.

Berkowitz's first short story, On the eve of Yom Kippur (בערב יום הכיפורים), was published in the Warsaw Hebrew newspaper HaTzofe in 1903. In 1905, Berkowitz moved to Vilna, where he worked as an editor for the Hebrew newspaper HaZman. It was there that he met and later married Sholom Aleichem's daughter in 1906.

In 1910, Berkowitz published his first Collected stories and soon thereafter he began to translate Sholom Aleichem's writings from Yiddish into Hebrew. Two years later, he translated Leo Tolstoy's Childhood from Russian into Hebrew. Berkowitz emigrated to the United States in 1913, on the eve of the First World War. From 1916 to 1919 he edited HaToren (The Mast), a Zionist-oriented periodical of high literary quality, and in 1919 he edited the short-lived journal Miklat (shelter, asylum, refuge or haven).

After arriving in Palestinian Mandate in 1928, he co-edited the weekly newspaper Moznayim with Fishel Lachower, while also adapting to the stage several of Sholom Aleichem's plays for Habima Theater.

Awards

 In 1944, Berkowitz was awarded the Tchernichovsky Prize for exemplary translation, for his translations of Sholom Aleichem's Collected works.
 In 1952, he was awarded the Bialik Prize (literary award named after the poet Hayyim Nahman Bialik) for his Stories and plays (סיפורים ומחזות).
 In 1958, he was awarded the Israel Prize, for literature.
 In 1965, Berkowitz was awarded the Bialik Prize a second time, for his Childhood chapters (פירקי ילדות).

See also
Literature of Israel
List of Israel Prize recipients
List of Bialik Prize recipients

References

External links

 The Institute for the Translation of Hebrew Literature (ithl.org.il)
 
 

1885 births
1967 deaths
People from Slutsk
People from Slutsky Uyezd
Belarusian Jews
Emigrants from the Russian Empire to the United States
American emigrants to Mandatory Palestine
Ashkenazi Jews in Mandatory Palestine
Israeli Ashkenazi Jews
Israel Prize in literature recipients
Israeli translators
Israeli journalists
Israeli male short story writers
Israeli short story writers
20th-century translators
20th-century short story writers
20th-century male writers
Burials at Trumpeldor Cemetery
20th-century journalists